Hartleyville may refer to:

Hartleyville, Indiana
Hartleyville, Ohio